Vlaho Stulli (Croatised as Vlaho Stulić; 8 October 1768 – 19 December 1843), was a Croatian and Ragusan poet, playwright and public servant of the Republic of Ragusa. Influenced by Croatian-Ragusan writers Nikola Nalješković and Marin Držić, as well as Italian Carlo Goldoni, he is best known for his naturalistic satire comediographic work Kate Sukurica in Croatian, Diario (Diary) in Italian and epigrams in Latin language, written to his friends.
Stulli lived and wrote during the period of the stronger influence of the French language and literature ("French wave" known as frančezarija) in Dubrovnik, whose writers and playwrights translated many of Molière's comedies into Croatian, adapting them to local idiom and mentality, as well as influences of Latin language, Italian language theatre troupes and style-pluralistic Croatian literature; the 18th century being considered the "golden century" of Ragusan literature. Stulli is the most prominent representative of the late 18th-century Ragusan drama and his comedy Kate Kapularica the best Ragusan play of that time.

Works 
 Kate Kapuralica: Među vratima od Peskarije učinjena u Dubrovniku god. 1800. od V. S., Ragusa, 1800. 
 Theatrically premiered in 1966 in the Croatian National Theatre, Split.
 Diario, 1962. (posthumously published)

Legacy 
 Street in Zagreb's neughbourhood of Špansko is named after him (Croatian: ”Ulica Vlahe Stulića”).

References

Literature 
 
 
 
 

1768 births
1843 deaths
People from the Republic of Ragusa
Croatian poets
Croatian dramatists and playwrights
Epigrammatists
Croatian satirists
Naturalism (literature)
18th-century Croatian writers
19th-century Croatian writers